Charles-Marie-Jean-Albert Widor (21 February 1844 – 12 March 1937) was a French organist, composer and teacher of the mid-Romantic era, most notable for his ten organ symphonies. His Toccata from the fifth organ symphony has become one of the best known and most often performed works for organ.

As of 2022, he is the longest-serving organist of Saint-Sulpice in Paris, a role he held for 63 years (January 1870 – 31 December 1933). He also was organ professor at the Paris Conservatory from 1890 to 1896 (following César Franck) and then he became professor of composition at the same institution, following Théodore Dubois.

Widor was a prolific composer, writing music for organ, piano, voice and ensembles. Apart from his ten organ symphonies, he also wrote three symphonies for orchestra and organ, several songs for piano and voice, four operas and a ballet. He was one of the first composers to use the term "symphony" for some of his organ compositions, helped in this by the organs built by Aristide Cavaillé-Coll.

Life

Widor was born in Lyon to a family of organ builders, and initially studied music there with his father, Hungarian-born François-Charles Widor titular organist of Saint-François-de-Sales from 1838 to 1889. His mother was Françoise-Elisabeth Peiron. The French organ builder Aristide Cavaillé-Coll, reviver of the art of organ building, was a friend of the Widor family; he arranged for the talented young organist to study in Brussels in 1863 with Jacques-Nicolas Lemmens for organ technique and with the elderly François-Joseph Fétis, director of the Brussels Conservatoire, for composition.  After this term of study, Widor moved to Paris where he resided for the rest of his life. At the age of 24, he was appointed assistant to Camille Saint-Saëns at Église de la Madeleine.

In January 1870, with the combined lobbying of Cavaillé-Coll, Saint-Saëns, and Charles Gounod, the 25-year-old Widor was appointed as "provisional" organist of Saint-Sulpice in Paris, the most prominent position for a French organist. The organ at St-Sulpice was Cavaillé-Coll's masterwork; the instrument's spectacular capabilities proved an inspiration to Widor. Despite his job's ostensibly "provisional" nature, Widor remained as organist at St-Sulpice for nearly 64 years until the end of 1933. He was succeeded in 1934 by his former student and assistant, Marcel Dupré.

In 1890, upon the death of César Franck, Widor succeeded him as organ professor at the Paris Conservatoire. The class he inherited was initially stunned by this new teacher, who suddenly demanded a formidable technique and a knowledge of J. S. Bach's organ works as prerequisites to effective improvisation. Later (1896), he gave up this post to become composition professor at the same institution. Widor had several students in Paris who were to become famous composers and organists in their own right, most notably the aforementioned Dupré, Louis Vierne, Charles Tournemire, Darius Milhaud, Alexander Schreiner, Edgard Varèse, and the Canadian Henri Gagnon. Albert Schweitzer also studied with Widor, mainly from 1899; master and pupil later collaborated on an annotated edition of J. S. Bach's organ works published in 1912 – 1914. Widor, whose own master Lemmens was an important Bach exponent, encouraged Schweitzer's theological exploration of Bach's music.

Among the leading organ recitalists of his time, Widor visited many different nations in this capacity, including Russia, England, Germany, the Netherlands, Portugal, Italy, Poland and Switzerland. In addition, he participated in the inaugural concerts of many of Cavaillé-Coll's greatest instruments, notably Notre-Dame de Paris, Saint-Germain-des-Près, the Trocadéro and Saint-Ouen de Rouen.

Well known as a man of great culture and learning, Widor was made a Chevalier de la Légion d'honneur in 1892, and reached the rank of a Grand-Officier de la Légion d'honneur in 1933. He was named to the Institut de France in 1910, and was elected "Secrétaire perpetuel" (permanent secretary) of the Académie des Beaux-Arts in 1914, succeeding Henry Roujon.

In 1921, Widor founded the American Conservatory at Fontainebleau with Francis-Louis Casadesus. He was the director until 1934, when he was succeeded by Maurice Ravel. His close friend, Isidor Philipp gave piano lessons there, and Nadia Boulanger taught an entire generation of new composers.

At the age of 76, Widor married Mathilde de Montesquiou-Fézensac on 26 April 1920 at Charchigné. The 36-year-old Mathilde was a member of one of the oldest and most prominent families of Europe. They had no children; she died in 1960.

On 31 December 1933, at age 89, Widor retired from his position at Saint-Sulpice. Three years later, he suffered a stroke which paralysed the right side of his body, although he remained mentally alert to the last.  He died at his home in Paris on 12 March 1937 at the age of 93, and his remains were interred in the crypt of Saint-Sulpice four days later. His tomb bears an incorrect birth year (1845).

Organ symphonies
Widor wrote music for a wide variety of instruments and ensembles (some of his songs for voice and piano are especially notable) and composed four operas and a ballet, but only his works for organ are played with any regularity today. These include: ten organ symphonies, three symphonies for orchestra with organ, Suite Latine, Trois Nouvelles Pièces, and six arrangements of works by Bach under the title Bach's Memento (1925). The organ symphonies are his most significant contribution to the organ repertoire.

It is unusual for a work written for one instrument to be assigned the term "symphony". However, Widor was at the forefront of a revival in French organ music, which utilized a new organ design pioneered by Aristide Cavaillé-Coll that was "symphonic" in style. The organ of the Baroque and Classical periods was designed to project a clear and crisp sound capable of handling contrapuntal writing. Cavaillé-Coll's organs, on the other hand, had a much warmer sound and a vast array of stops that extended the timbre of the instrument. This new style of organ, with a truly orchestral range of voicing and unprecedented abilities for smooth crescendos and diminuendos, encouraged composers to write music that was fully symphonic in scope. This trend was not limited to France, and was reflected in Germany by the organs built by Eberhard Friedrich Walcker and the works of Franz Liszt, Julius Reubke, and Max Reger.

Widor's symphonies can be divided into three groups. The first four symphonies comprise Op. 13 (1872) and are more properly termed "suites". (Widor himself called them "collections".) They represent Widor's early style. Widor made later revisions to the earlier symphonies. Some of these revisions were quite extensive.

With the Opus 42 symphonies, Widor shows his mastery and refinement of contrapuntal technique, while exploring to the fullest the capabilities of the Cavaillé-Coll organs for which these works were written. The Fifth Symphony has five movements, the last of which is the famous Toccata. The Sixth Symphony is also famous for its opening movement Allegro. The Seventh and Eighth Symphonies are the longest and least performed of Widor's Symphonies. The Seventh Symphony contains six movements, and the first version of the Eighth Symphony had seven. (Widor subsequently removed the Prélude for the 1901 edition.)

The ninth and tenth symphonies, respectively termed "Gothique" (Op. 70, of 1895) and "Romane" (Op. 73, of 1900), are much more introspective. They both derive thematic material from plainchant:  Symphonie Gothique uses the Christmas Day Introit "Puer natus est" in the third and fourth movements, while the Symphonie Romane has the Easter Gradual "Haec dies" woven throughout all four movements. They also honored, respectively, the Gothic Church of St. Ouen, Rouen and the Romanesque Basilica of St. Sernin, Toulouse, with the new Cavaillé-Coll organs installed in each. The second movement of the Symphonie Gothique, entitled "Andante sostenuto", is one of Widor's most-beloved pieces.  Dating from this same period, and also based on a plainsong theme, is the "Salve Regina" movement, a late addition to the much earlier second symphony.

Widor's best-known piece for the organ is the final movement of his Symphony for Organ No. 5, a toccata, which is often played as a recessional at wedding ceremonies and at the close of the Christmas Midnight Mass at Saint Peter's Basilica, Vatican City. Although the Fourth Symphony also opens with a Toccata, it is in a dramatically different (and earlier) style. The Toccata from Symphony No. 5 is the first of the toccatas characteristic of French Romantic organ music, and served as a model for later works by Gigout, Boëllmann, Mulet, Vierne and Dupré. Widor was pleased with the worldwide renown this single piece afforded him, but he was unhappy with how fast many other organists played it. Widor himself always played the Toccata rather deliberately. Many organists play it at a very fast tempo whereas Widor preferred a more controlled articulation to be involved. He recorded the piece, at St. Sulpice in his eighty-ninth year; the tempo used for the Toccata is quite slow. Isidor Philipp transcribed the Toccata for two pianos.

Over his long career, Widor returned again and again to edit his earlier music, even after publication. His biographer, John Near, reports: "Ultimately, it was discovered that over a period of about sixty years, as many as eight different editions were issued for some of the symphonies."

Compositions
Rough dates of composition/publication are in brackets, along with the original publisher, if known.

Orchestral works

Organ solo

Chamber work

(Salvum fac populum tuum Op. 84 is also known in english as "Lord, Save Thy People")

Piano solo

Songs and choral works

Stage music

Writings
Technique de l'orchestre moderne faisant suite au Traité d'instrumentation de H. Berlioz (1904, Paris: Lemoine)
L'Orgue moderne, la décadence dans la facture contemporaine (1928, Paris: Durand)
Vieilles Chansons pour les Petits Enfants: avec Accompagnements de Ch. M. Widor From the Collections at the Library of Congress

Recordings
 Complete organ works by Ben van Oosten
 The 10 symphonies for organ, by Pierre Pincemaille, on 10 Cavaillé-Coll organs - Solstice SOCD 181-185.
 ,  et  symphonies for organ, performed by Marc Dubugnon at the Swiss Reformed Church of Saint Martin, in Vevey, the three symphonies on YouTube

Notes

References

——— (2011).  Widor: A Life Beyond the Toccata.  Series: Eastman Studies in Music, v. 83.  Rochester, NY: University of Rochester Press

 

Hobbs, Alain (1988). Charles-Marie Widor (1844–1937). L’Orgue, Cahiers et mémoires, No. 40. L’Association des Amis de l’Orgue.

External links

 (Embellishments), John R. Near, The Complete Organ Symphonies of Charles-Marie Widor
 Toccata in F from Symphony No. 5 interactive hypermedia (Shockwave Player required) at the BinAural Collaborative Hypertext
 Performances of organ works by Charles-Marie Widor in MIDI format at Logos Virtual Library
 
 
 
 

1844 births
1937 deaths
19th-century classical composers
19th-century French composers
19th-century French male musicians
20th-century classical composers
20th-century French composers
20th-century French male musicians
Academic staff of the Conservatoire de Paris
Composers for pipe organ
French classical organists
French male classical composers
French opera composers
French people of Hungarian descent
French Romantic composers
Honorary Members of the Royal Philharmonic Society
Male opera composers
French male organists
Members of the Académie des beaux-arts
Organ improvisers
Musicians from Lyon
Pupils of François-Joseph Fétis
Male classical organists